The War Cross is a high military award of Spain to recognise battlefield bravery. This decoration aims to prize those who have realized actions or facts of great efficiency, or they have given excellent services, both with valour during a continued period, inside one armed conflicts or of military operations involving or could involve resort to force, and carrying military abilities or remarkable command skills.

The medal was established in 1938 (BOE. Núm. 526) and has four different types:

Gran Cruz
Cruz de Guerra para Jefes
Cruz de Guerra para oficiales y suboficiales
Cruz de Guerra para Cabos y Soldados

The Spanish War Cross is modified by the Royal Decree 1 Royal Decree 1040/2003, 1 August  (Spanish  Official Gazette  No. 177) that reduced the categories to one,  Cruz (Cross) establishing an insignia with a new design.

References 
Royal Decree 1040/2003, 1st August, Spanish Military Decorations Regulations.  Retrieved 21 November 2012.

Military awards and decorations of Spain